A Pilot's Guide to the Drexilthar Subsector is a 1984 role-playing game supplement, written by J. Andrew Keith for Traveller published by Gamelords. A Pilot's Guide to the Drexilthar Subsector is a supplement that covers one subsector in the Reavers' Deep sector.

Publication history
A Pilot's Guide to the Drexilthar Subsector was written by Andrew Keith, with art by William H. Keith Jr., and was published in 1984 by Gamelords as a digest-sized 48-page book.

Reception
Stephen Nutt reviewed A Pilots Guide to the Drexilthar Sector for Imagine magazine, and stated that "it is well produced and what it contains is good, sensible stuff. Pilots Guide is a welcome addition to any Traveller collection. It will be of use to the beginner and the veteran alike."

William A. Barton reviewed A Pilot's Guide to the Drexilthar Subsector in The Space Gamer No. 72. Barton commented that "if you're tired of the worlds of the Spinward Marches or the Solomani Rim and haven't created your own subsector for adventure, you might find A Pilot's Guide to the Drexilthar Subsector your key to an interesting place to hang your vacc-suit helmet."

Reviews
 Different Worlds #41 (Jan./Feb., 1986)

References

Role-playing game supplements introduced in 1984
Traveller (role-playing game) supplements